Super 8 or Super Eight may refer to:

Film 
 Super 8 film, a motion picture film format released in 1965
 Super 8 film camera, a motion picture camera used to film Super 8mm motion picture format
 Super 8 (2011 film), a science-fiction film written and directed by J. J. Abrams
 Super 8 Stories, a 2001 documentary film

Sport 
 Rugby League Super 8s, Great Britain
 Super 8 (cricket round), at the Cricket World Cup
 Super 8 (SRL), a Student Rugby League competition in the United Kingdom
 Super Eight (baseball), high school tournament, Massachusetts, United States
 Super 8 (hockey), high school ice hockey tournament, Massachusetts, United States
 Super 8 Boxing Tournament, New Zealand
 Super 8 (Handball League), England
 All-Ireland Super 8s, Gaelic football

Music 
 Super 8 (album), 1999 album by Züri West
 super8 (musical group), Danish music group
 Super8, a DJ of the duo Super8 & Tab
 Super 8 (band), an American rock band from Los Angeles, California active from 1993 to 1997.

Technology
 Zilog Z8, the Zilog Super-8 family microcontroller architecture

Other 
 "Super 8" (The Killing), television series episode
 Super 8 (video game accessory), a 1995-era adaptor for playing NES games on Nintendo SNES systems
 Super 8 Motels, also named Super 8 Worldwide
 Super 8 schools, association of boys' schools in the central North Island of New Zealand

See also
 Super 8½, 1994 satirical film